Mill Run Playhouse (aka Mill Run Theatre) was a 1,600 seat theatre in the round in Niles, Illinois.  It was built in 1965 on the grounds of the Golf Mill Shopping Center.  It was scheduled to open in June 1965 but torrential rains delayed the opening to July 2, 1965.  It was demolished in August 1984. Its last show was a performance by Lou Rawls on August 1.

History

Mill Run was originally a venue for off-Broadway shows. It closed sometime in the late 1960s.  In 1969, a group headed by Gerald Kaufman, Sammy Davis, Jr., and Donjo Medlevine (a former owner of the Chez Paris), leased the theater from Golf Mill Shopping Center.  The plan of the new operators was to bring to the theater Las Vegas entertainers, each act opening on a Tuesday and performing 8 or 9 shows - 1 show each night from Tuesday through Thursday, 1 or 2 shows on Friday, and 2 shows on Saturday and Sunday (some shows were booked for weekend performances only, depending on popularity/availability of performers).  Almost every show had an opening act and the 20-minute intermission between acts was utilized by the theater to sell drinks and candy.  Long before the theater showed a profit, it was kept solvent by the sale of liquor.

The first act to perform - in early 1970 - was Shecky Greene, who was paid $30,000 for the appearance (tickets went for $7.50). One of the last to perform - in 1984 - was Diana Ross, who was paid $250,000 (tickets now cost $25).  In the mid-1970s, management started booking one-night stands on Monday nights, sometimes boxing matches, sometimes headliners.  Tom Waits was one of the first to perform on a Monday night.  His performance sold out, all records for candy sales were broken, and the theater came close to the single night record for liquor sales.  When Kaufman saw the figures. he told Butch Wonders, his manager, to re-book Tom Waits.  Butch said that Mr. Waits said he would never work there again as it was the first time he had ever worked in a venue where the patrons "didn't vomit in the aisles."   
Periodically, the theater would showcase a musical or play, such as Sweet Charity, Hair, Grease, and Jesus Christ Superstar.

Throughout this time, the theater presented shows for children on weekday and weekend mornings.  Harry Lee Rogers ran this operation, handling scripts, costumes, music, lighting, casting, and directing single-handedly.

In 1971, Marquee Enterprises was formed to operate Mill Run.  It then opened a second venue in San Carlos, California (Circle Star Theater), and subsequently opened other theaters in Los Angeles, Sunrise (Florida), Louisville, Atlanta, and New York.  It also ran shows at Radio City Music Hall in New York for 13 weeks a year for several years. It also booked shows for other owners' venues (such as Holiday Star Theater in Merrillville, Indiana).

The theater closed when Golf Mill Shopping Center, the owner of the property, refused to renew the lease in 1984.  The site is now part of the parking lot of the shopping center.

Notable performers

References

External links
Belli & Belli Architects and Engineers

Buildings and structures demolished in 1984
Demolished theatres in Illinois
Niles, Illinois
Theatres completed in 1965